The  Challenge des phosphates is a series of One-day races held annually since 2011 in Morocco. It consists of three One-day races; Grand prix de Khouribga, Grand Prix Fkih Ben Saleh and Grand prix de Ben Guerir, each rated 1.2 and is part of UCI Africa Tour.

Winners – Grand prix de Khouribga

Winners – Grand Prix Fkih Ben Saleh

Winners – Grand prix de Ben Guerir

References

Cycle races in Morocco
2011 establishments in Morocco
Recurring sporting events established in 2010
UCI Africa Tour races